KZKZ may refer to:

KZKZ-FM, a radio station (105.3 FM) licensed to Greenwood, Arkansas, United States
KZKZ (Philippines), a defunct radio station (540 AM) licensed to Manila, Philippines